1508 Kemi, provisional designation , is an eccentric, carbonaceous asteroid and one of the largest Mars-crossers, approximately 17 kilometers in diameter. Discovered by Heikki Alikoski at Turku Observatory in 1938, the asteroid was later named after the Finnish town of Kemi and the Kemi River.

Discovery 

Kemi was discovered on 21 October 1938, by Finnish astronomer Heikki Alikoski at the Iso-Heikkilä Observatory in Turku, Finland. It was independently discovered by Hungarian astronomer György Kulin at Konkoly Observatory near Budapest on 30 October 1938. The Minor Planet Center, however, only acknowledges the first discoverer.

Orbit and classification 

Kemi is a Mars-crossing asteroid as it crosses the orbit of Mars at 1.666 AU. Because of its high inclination, it has been grouped with the Pallas family, an asteroid family of bright carbonaceous asteroids, as well as with the "Phaethon group", despite its untypical spectrum.

It orbits the Sun at a distance of 1.6–3.9 AU once every 4 years and 7 months (1,685 days). Its orbit has an eccentricity of 0.42 and an inclination of 29° with respect to the ecliptic. The body's observation arc begins at Uccle in May 1935, more than 3 years prior to its official discovery observation at Turku.

Physical characteristics 

In the SMASS classification, Kemi is a common carbonaceous C-type asteroid. In the Tholen classification, the body's spectral type is ambiguous (BCF), closest to that of a bright carbonaceous B-type and somewhat similar to a C- and F-type asteroid.

Rotation period 

Several rotational lightcurves of Kemi have been obtained from photometric observations since the 1990s. Analysis of the lightcurves gave a consolidated rotation period of 9.196 hours with a brightness variation between of 0.25 and 0.55 magnitude.

Poles 

In 2016, an international study modeled a lightcurve with a concurring period of 9.19182 hours. It also determined two spin axis at (352.0°, 72.0°) and (166.0°, 73.0°) in ecliptic coordinates (λ, β).

Diameter and albedo 

According to the surveys carried out by the Japanese Akari satellite and the NEOWISE mission of NASA's Wide-field Infrared Survey Explorer, Kemi measures between 15.78 and 17.98 kilometers in diameter and its surface has an albedo between 0.084 and 0.11. The Collaborative Asteroid Lightcurve Link assumes a standard albedo for carbonaceous asteroids of 0.057 and calculates a diameter of 21.86 kilometers based on an absolute magnitude of 12.03.

Naming 

This minor planet was named after the Finnish town of Kemi and the Kemi River (Kemijoki), the largest river in Finland, on which the town lies. The naming agrees with the established pattern of giving high-inclination asteroids four-letter names. The official  was published by the Minor Planet Center on 20 February 1976.

Notes

References

External links 
 Asteroid Lightcurve Database (LCDB), query form (info )
 Dictionary of Minor Planet Names, Google books
 Asteroids and comets rotation curves, CdR – Observatoire de Genève, Raoul Behrend
 Discovery Circumstances: Numbered Minor Planets (1)-(5000) – Minor Planet Center
 
 

001508
Discoveries by Heikki A. Alikoski
Named minor planets
001508
001508
19381021